List of important leaders of the Communist Party of Vietnam and the Socialist Republic of Vietnam:

See also 
Politics of Vietnam
Central Committee of the Communist Party of Vietnam
Politburo of the Communist Party of Vietnam
General Secretary of the Communist Party of Vietnam
Vietnamese Fatherland Front
National Assembly of Vietnam
Deputy Prime Minister of Vietnam
List of prime ministers of Vietnam
President of Vietnam

References

Lists of political office-holders in Vietnam